Margarita López Portillo y Pacheco (1914–2006) was a Mexican novelist who earned several awards for her novels and also had three of them adapted for film. She was a public servant, serving under three presidents in various capacities of regulating media. During her brother José López Portillo's (1976-1982) presidency, she received sharp criticism for his nepotism and failure to act on warnings of potential fire at the National Cinema Library. She studied the works of Sister Juana Inés de la Cruz and led an effort to restore the convent where the Sister had lived. In 1980, she was granted the French Order of Arts and Letters.

Biography
Margarita López Portillo y Pacheco was born in 1914 in Guadalajara, Jalisco, Mexico. Her family was one of intellectuals and military officers, as her grandfather José López Portillo y Rojas had been a writer, was a member of the Mexican Academy of Language and one-time governor of the state of Jalisco. Her father, José López Portillo y Weber served as a cadet during the Ten Tragic Days in the service of President Francisco I. Madero. She graduated with a degree in letters from the National Autonomous University of Mexico and published her first book Los laureles in 1952. El Universal Gráfico awarded her the “Lanz Duret” Prize for her debut novel. In 1954, she was awarded the “Lanz Duret” Prize for her novel "Toña Machetes" and earned the Sor Juana Ines de la Cruz Prize in 1956 for her third novel, Tierra bronca.

In 1958, she joined a group of writers who worked under the direction of Fausto Vega and later under Agustín Yáñez. She published pieces in numerous magazines, including Ábside, Mujeres and El Rehilete. In 1964, she began working under the Ministry of the Interior for the Gustavo Díaz Ordaz regime as the supervisor of television productions and the Directorate General of Cinematography. In 1974, President Luis Echeverría appointed her as Director of the Museo Tecnológico de la CFE (Museum of Technology of the Federal Electricity Commission (CFE)) and Cultural Dissemination Advisor for Workers In 1975, she was made the Divisional Manager of the Federal Electricity Commission for Guadalajara and Jalisco.

In 1976, after her brother, José López Portillo, was elected president, but before he took office, Margarita was the victim of an attempted kidnapping by the Liga Comunista 23 de Septiembre, during which one of the leaders of the organization, David Jiménez Sarmiento, was killed. Upon assuming office, López Portillo made Margarita head of the General Directorate of Radio, Television and Cinematography (RTC), and she immediately reversed the policy of the previous administration. The previous policy had drastically reduced the number of films produced by denying credit to any private film producers, virtually requiring official participation in all filmmaking. However, while Margarita's policy increased production, it did not improve the quality of films being produced. She was also appointed head of the Mexican Social Security Institute during her brother's presidency from 1976 to 1982. She was resoundingly criticized for her management of the RTC and when the  burned and five people were killed in the fire of 24 March 1982, Margarita was blamed for not having heeded warnings of danger.

In the late 1970s, Margarita made a study of the works Sister Juana Inés de la Cruz, writing two books and several articles about her works. She led an effort to restore the convent where the Sister had lived and served as Chairman of the Board of the committee for preservation of Sor Juana Ines de la Cruz. In 1980, she was awarded an honorary doctorate by the Universidad Autónoma del Estado de México and the same year was granted the French Order of Arts and Letters. However, in 1995 a scandal erupted when it was discovered that Margarita had taken the famous medallion of Sor Juana to her own home, which was widely seen as yet another instance of abuse of power by Mexican political families. She was persuaded to return the Mexican national treasure, which is now on display in the Mexican National Congress.

She died on 9 May 2006.

Selected works

Written works
 Los Laureles Mexico (1952)
 Toña Machetes Mexico: Bruguera Mexicana de Ediciones (1954) 
 Tierra bronca Mexico: Botas (1956)
 Los días de la voz México: Porrúa (1975)
 Estampas de Juana Ines de la Cruz Lapéox México: Editora del Sureste (1978)
 Sor Juana México: Fomento Cultural Banamex (1979)
 Los Registros de bienes y la investigación histórica México: Instituto de Estudios y Documentos Históricos (1980)

Screenwriting
 Historical telenovela Maximiliano y Carlota (1965)
 Estampas de Sor Juana (1980) 
 Toña Machetes (1985)

External links
 WorldCat Publications list

References

1914 births
2006 deaths
Mexican women novelists
Writers from Guadalajara, Jalisco
20th-century Mexican novelists
20th-century Mexican women writers
20th-century Mexican screenwriters